KEYY (1450 AM) is a Christian radio station licensed to Provo, Utah, United States. The station is broadcasting via a translator on 91.3 FM in Provo as well. The station is owned by Biblical Ministries Worldwide, a Christian organization.

History
The station began broadcasting in December 1949, and originally held the call sign KNEU. The station was owned by Mid-Utah Broadcasting. In 1952, the station's call sign was changed to KEYY. The station aired a MOR format in the early 1970s. By the mid-1970s, the station had adopted a top 40 format. By 1980, the station was airing an adult contemporary format. By 1983, the station had begun airing the Music of Your Life adult standards format. The station had returned to an adult contemporary format by 1985. In 1986, the station was donated to Touch Outreach Ministries, and in 1987 the station began airing its current Christian format. The station was sold to Biblical Ministries Worldwide the following year.

Repeaters and translators
In 2010, KEYY began to be simulcast on 91.7 KEYR in Richfield, Utah and 91.9 KEYP in Price, Utah, and in 2011 it began to simulcast on 91.7 KEYV in Vernal, Utah. In 2016, Biblical Ministries Worldwide purchased 91.3 K217CL in Provo, Utah, which would begin simulcasting KEYY. In 2017, a translator for KEYY was licensed, broadcasting at 95.5 MHz in Payson, Utah.

References

External links
KEYY's official website

EYY
Radio stations established in 1949
1949 establishments in Utah